Knob Lick was an unincorporated community in  Casey County, Kentucky, United States. It is now a ghost town.

References

Unincorporated communities in Casey County, Kentucky
Unincorporated communities in Kentucky